Blackwater Park was a progressive rock band from Berlin, Germany, with an English vocalist. They released only one album, Dirt Box, which included a cover of The Beatles' "For No One". The album was originally released in 1972 and re-released in 1990. The name of the band comes from the name of the gothic mansion setting of Wilkie Collins' The Woman in White.

Mikael Åkerfeldt of Opeth named one of his band's albums after this band.

Line-up
 Richard Routledge (vocals, guitar)
 Michael Fechner (guitar)
 Andreas Scholz (bass guitar)
 Norbert Kagelmann (drums)

Discography

Dirt Box (1972)
"Mental Block" – 3:18
"Roundabout" – 5:27
"One's Life" – 3:09
"Indian Summer" – 6:16
"Dirty Face" – 4:30
"Rock Song" – 8:46
"For No One" – 3:29 (Lennon–McCartney)

(All tracks accredited to Blackwater Park unless stated)

Total length: 36:00

References

German rock music groups
Musical groups from Berlin